Jacob Ericksson (born Jacob Abel Joachim Eriksson on 7 January 1967 in Sala, Sweden) is a Swedish actor, educated at Gothenburg Theatre Academy.

Partial filmography 

 1994: Rena Rama Rolf (TV Series)
 1995: En på miljonen - Elias, Cissis fästman
 1997: Adam & Eva - Åke
 1997: Glappet (TV Mini-Series) - Mattias at the pizza shop
 1997: Rika barn leka bäst - The film director
 1998: Pappas flicka (TV Series) - Stefan Juckert
 1999: Tsatsiki, morsan och polisen - Polisen, Göran
 2000: Det blir aldrig som man tänkt sig - Freddie
 2000: Det okända - Jacob
 2001: Sprängaren - Pelle Oskarsson
 2002-2007: Tusenbröder (TV Series) - Tommy
 2004: Allt och lite till (TV Series) - Jonas
 2005: Coachen (TV Mini-Series) - Ralf
 2006: Tusenbröder – Återkomsten - Tommy
 2006: LasseMajas detektivbyrå (TV Series) - Frank Franksson
 2007: Iskariot - Valle
 2008: Patrik, Age 1.5 - Lennart Ljung
 2008: Höök (TV Series) - Blom
 2008: Vi hade i alla fall tur med vädret – igen - Peppe
 2008: LasseMajas detektivbyrå - Kameleontens hämnd - Conny Kameleont
 2009: De halvt dolda (TV Mini-Series) - Calle
 2009: The Girl with the Dragon Tattoo - Christer Malm
 2009: Wallander (TV Series) - Olle
 2009: The Girl Who Played with Fire - Christer Malm
 2009: The Girl Who Kicked the Hornets' Nest - Christer Malm
 2010: Änglavakt - Birger
 2010: Tusen gånger starkare - Olle - So- & Klasslärare
 2010: Våra vänners liv (TV Series) - Pontus
 2013: Crimes of Passion (TV Movie) - Tord
 2017: All Inclusive - Tommy
 2019: Swoon - Grey Man

External links 

 
 
 
 
 
 

Swedish male actors
1967 births
Living people